Maximilian Morlock (11 May 1925–10 September 1994) was a German footballer active in the 1950s and early 1960s. In his time with the West Germany national team, he earned 26 caps and scored 21 goals. His position was that of an inside right forward.

In his youth he learned to play football at Eintracht Nürnberg. In 1940 he became a member of the then famous 1. FC Nürnberg, debuting in the first team on 30 November 1941. Until 1964 he appeared more than 900 times in the first team of the so-called Club and scored about 700 goals. In 1948 and 1961 he led the team to German championships, in 1962 to the German Cup. 38 years old he even appeared 21 times in the founding season of the German Bundesliga. He also was top scorer of the Oberliga Süd in 1950–51 and 1951–52.

His first cap for the national team was in 1950, when he played instead of the injured Fritz Walter. He was a member of the West Germany team that won their first World Cup in 1954. In the final match against Hungary Morlock scored West Germany's first goal to start the comeback after going 2–0 down. He received his last cap in a friendly game against Egypt in December 1958.

As a player, Morlock's strengths were a sound technique coupled with fighting spirit. As a linkman he felt at home best between defense and attack, but he was also dangerous in front of the goal.

Morlock died from cancer on 10 September 1994, aged 69.

Honours
 In 1961 he was voted German Footballer of the Year by the Association of German Sports Journalists.
 In 1995, less than a year after his death, the square in front of the Frankenstadion, home of the 1. FC Nürnberg, was renamed Max-Morlock-Platz in his honour. The stadium's postal address is Max-Morlock-Platz 1.
 In 2006, a majority of fans voted in favour of renaming the Frankenstadion itself into "Max-Morlock-Stadion", but the city of Nuremberg won a sponsorship deal with a local bank, which included renaming the stadium EasyCredit-Stadion after one of that bank's financial products. His name was finally used as the stadium's name in July 2017.

External links

References

1925 births
1994 deaths
Footballers from Nuremberg
Association football forwards
German footballers
Germany international footballers
FIFA World Cup-winning players
1954 FIFA World Cup players
1. FC Nürnberg players
Bundesliga players
West German footballers